Opiranserin (developmental code name VVZ-149) is a selective and combined glycine GlyT2 transporter blocker ( = 0.86 μM), purine P2X3 receptor antagonist ( = 0.87 μM), and serotonin 5-HT2A receptor antagonist ( = 1.3 μM) which is under development by Vivozon for the intravenous treatment of postoperative pain. As of April 2017, it is in phase II clinical trials for this indication. The  of the drug was issued in 2017.

References

5-HT2A antagonists
Dimethylamino compounds
Analgesics
Benzamides
Experimental drugs
Glycine reuptake inhibitors
Receptor antagonists